is a 1950 Jidaigeki psychological thriller-crime film directed and written by Akira Kurosawa, working in close collaboration with cinematographer Kazuo Miyagawa. Starring Toshiro Mifune, Machiko Kyō, Masayuki Mori, and Takashi Shimura as various people who describe how a samurai was murdered in a forest, the plot and characters are based upon Ryunosuke Akutagawa’s short story "In a Grove", with the title and framing story being based on "Rashōmon", another short story by Akutagawa. Every element is largely identical, from the murdered samurai speaking through a Shinto psychic to the bandit in the forest, the monk, the assault of the wife and the dishonest retelling of the events in which everyone shows his or her ideal self by lying.

The film is known for a plot device that involves various characters providing subjective, alternative and contradictory versions of the same incident. Rashomon was the first Japanese film to receive a significant international reception; it won the Golden Lion at the Venice Film Festival in 1951, was given an Academy Honorary Award at the 24th Academy Awards in 1952, and is considered one of the greatest films ever made. The Rashomon effect is named after the film.

Plot

Prologue 
The plot begins in Heian era Kyoto. A woodcutter and a priest are sitting beneath the Rashōmon city gate to stay dry in a downpour when a commoner joins them and they begin recounting a very disturbing story about an assault and murder that took place. Neither the woodcutter nor the priest understand how everyone involved could have given radically different accounts of the same event, with all three of the people involved indicating that they, and they alone, committed the murder.

The woodcutter claims he found the body of a murdered samurai while looking for wood in the forest, three days earlier. He first found a woman's hat (which belonged to the samurai's wife), then a samurai cap (which belonged to her husband), then cut rope (which had been used to bind the husband), then an amulet. Finally, he discovered the samurai's body, upon which he fled to notify the authorities. The priest claims he saw the samurai traveling with his wife the same day the murder happened. Both men were summoned to testify in court, where a fellow witness presented a captured bandit, who claimed to have followed the couple after coveting the woman when he glimpsed the pair traveling through the forest.

The bandit's story
Tajōmaru, the bandit and a notorious outlaw, claims that he tricked the samurai to step off the mountain trail with him to look at a cache of ancient swords he had discovered. In a grove, he tied the samurai to a tree, then brought the samurai's wife there with the intention of assaulting her. She initially tried to defend herself with a dagger but was overpowered and then seduced by the bandit. The wife, ashamed, begged Tajōmaru to duel her husband to the death, to save her from the guilt and shame of having two men know her dishonor. She promised to go with the man who won their battle. Tajōmaru honorably set the samurai free and dueled with him. They fought skillfully and fiercely, with Tajōmaru praising the samurai's swordsmanship. In the end, Tajōmaru killed the samurai before realizing the wife had fled. At the end of his testimony, he is asked about the expensive dagger used by the samurai's wife to defend herself. Tajōmaru claims he forgot about it in the confusion after the fight, and laments leaving it behind, as the dagger's pearl inlay made it very valuable.

The Commoner claims that men often lie, even to themselves, because they are weak.

The wife's story
The wife's testimony tells a different story. She claims that Tajōmaru left immediately after raping her. Once he was gone, she cut her husband free from his bonds and begged her husband for forgiveness. But he simply stared at her coldly, blaming her for the assault. She begs her husband to kill her so that she would be at peace with her honor restored, but he continued to stare at her with loathing. His contempt distressed her so greatly, she fainted while standing over her husband, with the dagger in her hands. She awoke to find her husband dead, the dagger in his chest. In shock, she wandered through the forest until she came upon a pond. She attempted to drown herself, but failed.

The Commoner claims that women often use their tears to hide lies.

The samurai's story
Lastly, the court hears the story from the perspective of the samurai, as told through a medium. The samurai claims that after the rape, Tajōmaru asked the wife to live with him. To the Samurai's great shame, his wife accepts the proposal but asked Tajōmaru to first kill her husband. Disgusted at the Wife's request, Tajōmaru grabbed her and gave the samurai the choice: let her go or kill her. The samurai notes that this gesture almost allowed him to forgive Tajōmaru. The wife broke free and fled, with Tajōmaru giving chase. Tajōmaru failed to recapture her, gave up, and returned to set the samurai free. Tajōmaru apologized and then departed. Humiliated, the samurai killed himself with his wife's dagger. Later, he felt someone remove the dagger from his chest, but could not tell who.

The Commoner notes that men often lie to protect their honor.

The woodcutter's story
Back at Rashōmon (after the trial - the verdict is never revealed), the woodcutter claims that all three stories are falsehoods and notes that the samurai was killed by a sword, not a dagger. Catching this admission, the Commoner gets the woodcutter to admit that he witnessed the assault and murder, but declined the opportunity to testify because he did not want to get involved. According to the woodcutter, after the rape, Tajōmaru begged the samurai's wife to marry him. Instead, she freed her husband, hoping that he would kill Tajōmaru. However, the samurai refused to fight, explaining to Tajōmaru that he would not risk his life for a spoiled woman. With the samurai no longer caring for the wife, Tajōmaru rescinds his promises to marry her and prepares to leave. The wife criticizes both men, calling them dishonorable cowards: Tajōmaru because he would not keep his word to kill the samurai to have her, the samurai because he would not kill Tajōmaru to avenge his own honor (saying a real man would fight Tajōmaru and then demand she kill herself). The two men unwillingly fight, both clearly terrified, in a pitiful duel nothing like what Tajōmaru describes in his testimony. Even the wife seems to regret having provoked the battle. Ultimately, Tajōmaru wins through a stroke of luck, and the samurai is killed while pitifully begging for his life (and Tajōmaru is disgusted at killing him). He attempts to take the wife with him but she rejects his advances and flees. Tajōmaru takes the samurai's sword and limps away.

Epilogue
At Rashōmon gate, the woodcutter, the priest, and the commoner are interrupted by the sound of a crying baby. They find a baby abandoned in a basket, with a kimono and a protective amulet. The commoner steals the kimono and amulet. The woodcutter reproaches the commoner for stealing from an orphaned child and attempts to stop him. The commoner overpowers the woodcutter, and chastises him as a hypocrite: the commoner correctly deduces that the true reason the woodcutter declined to testify is because he's the one who stole the valuable dagger. The commoner leaves Rashōmon gate, explaining that all men are motivated only by self-interest.

Meanwhile, the priest has been attempting to soothe the baby. After the commoner departs, the woodcutter attempts to take the baby. The priest violently recoils: his experiences at the trial and at Rashōmon gate have destroyed the priest's faith in humanity. The woodcutter explains that he intends to raise the child; he already has six of his own. This revelation recasts the woodcutter's story and motivations, restoring the priest's faith in humanity. As the woodcutter prepares to leave with the child, the rain stops and the clouds part, revealing the sun.

Cast
 Takashi Shimura as Kikori, the woodcutter
 Minoru Chiaki as Tabi Hōshi, the priest
 Kichijiro Ueda as the commoner
 Toshiro Mifune as Tajōmaru, the bandit
 Machiko Kyō as the Samurai's wife
 Masayuki Mori as the Samurai
 Noriko Honma as Miko, the medium
 Daisuke Katō as Houben, the policeman

Production
The name of the film refers to the enormous, former city gate "between modern-day Kyoto and Nara", on Suzaka Avenue's end to the south.

Development
Kurosawa felt that sound cinema multiplies the complexity of a film: Cinematic sound is never merely accompaniment, never merely what the sound machine caught while you took the scene. Real sound does not merely add to the images, it multiplies it. Regarding Rashomon, Kurosawa said, I like silent pictures and I always have... I wanted to restore some of this beauty. I thought of it, I remember in this way: one of the techniques of modern art is simplification, and that I must therefore simplify this film."

Accordingly, there are only three settings in the film: Rashōmon gate, the woods, and the courtyard. The gate and the courtyard are very simply constructed and the woodland is real. This is partly due to the low budget that Kurosawa gained from Daiei.

Casting
When Kurosawa shot Rashomon, the actors and the staff lived together, a system Kurosawa found beneficial. He recalls, We were a very small group and it was as though I was directing Rashomon every minute of the day and night. At times like this, you can talk everything over and get very close indeed.

Filming
The cinematographer, Kazuo Miyagawa, contributed numerous ideas, technical skill, and expertise in support for what would be an experimental and influential approach to cinematography. For example, in one sequence, there is a series of single close-ups of the bandit, then the wife, and then the husband, which then repeats to emphasize the triangular relationship between them.

The use of contrasting shots is another example of the film techniques used in Rashomon. According to Donald Richie, the length of time of the shots of the wife and of the bandit are the same when the bandit is acting barbarically and the wife is hysterically crazy.

Rashomon had camera shots that were directly into the sun. Kurosawa wanted to use natural light, but it was too weak; they solved the problem by using a mirror to reflect the natural light. The result makes the strong sunlight look as though it has traveled through the branches, hitting the actors. The rain in the scenes at the gate had to be tinted with black ink because camera lenses could not capture the water pumped through the hoses.

Lighting
Robert Altman compliments Kurosawa's use of "dappled" light throughout the film, which gives the characters and settings further ambiguity. In his essay "Rashomon," Tadao Sato suggests that the film (unusually) uses sunlight to symbolize evil and sin in the film, arguing that the wife gives in to the bandit's desires when she sees the sun. However, Professor Keiko I. McDonald opposes Sato's idea in her essay "The Dialectic of Light and Darkness in Kurosawa's Rashomon." McDonald says the film conventionally uses light to symbolize "good" or "reason" and darkness to symbolize "bad" or "impulse." She interprets the scene mentioned by Sato differently, pointing out that the wife gives herself to the bandit when the sun slowly fades out. McDonald also reveals that Kurosawa was waiting for a big cloud to appear over Rashomon gate to shoot the final scene in which the woodcutter takes the abandoned baby home; Kurosawa wanted to show that there might be another dark rain any time soon, even though the sky is clear at this moment. Unfortunately, the final scene appears optimistic because it was too sunny and clear to produce the effects of an overcast sky.

Editing
Stanley Kauffmann writes in The Impact of Rashomon that Kurosawa often shot a scene with several cameras at the same time, so that he could "cut the film freely and splice together the pieces which have caught the action forcefully as if flying from one piece to another." Despite this, he also used short shots edited together that trick the audience into seeing one shot; Donald Richie says in his essay that "there are 407 separate shots in the body of the film ... This is more than twice the number in the usual film, and yet these shots never call attention to themselves."

Music
The film was scored by Fumio Hayasaka, who is among the most respected of Japanese composers. At the director's request, he included a bolero during the woman's story.

Due to setbacks and some lost audio, the crew took the urgent step of bringing Mifune back to the studio after filming to record another line. Recording engineer Iwao Ōtani added it to the film along with the music, using a different microphone.

Allegorical and symbolic content

The film depicts the rape of a woman and the murder of her samurai husband through the widely differing accounts of four witnesses, including the bandit-rapist, the wife, the dead man (speaking through a medium), and lastly the woodcutter, the one witness who seems the most objective and least biased. The stories are mutually contradictory and even the final version may be seen as motivated by factors of ego and saving face. The actors kept approaching Kurosawa wanting to know the truth, and he claimed the point of the film was to be an exploration of multiple realities rather than an exposition of a particular truth. Later film and television use of the "Rashomon effect" focuses on revealing "the truth" in a now conventional technique that presents the final version of a story as the truth, an approach that only matches Kurosawa's film on the surface.

Due to its emphasis on the subjectivity of truth and the uncertainty of factual accuracy, Rashomon has been read by some as an allegory of the defeat of Japan at the end of World War II. James F. Davidson's article, "Memory of Defeat in Japan: A Reappraisal of Rashomon" in the December 1954 issue of the Antioch Review, is an early analysis of the World War II defeat elements. Another allegorical interpretation of the film is mentioned briefly in a 1995 article, "Japan: An Ambivalent Nation, an Ambivalent Cinema" by David M. Desser. Here, the film is seen as an allegory of the atomic bomb and Japanese defeat. It also briefly mentions James Goodwin's view on the influence of post-war events on the film. However, "In a Grove" (the short story by Akutagawa that the film is based on) was published already in 1922, so any postwar allegory would have been the result of Kurosawa's editing rather than the story about the conflicting accounts. Historian and critic David Conrad has noted that the use of rape as a plot point came at a time when American occupation authorities had recently stopped censoring Japanese media and belated accounts of rapes by occupation troops began to appear in Japanese newspapers. Moreover, Kurosawa and other filmmakers had not been allowed to make jidaigeki during the early part of the occupation, so setting a film in the distant past was a way to reassert domestic control over cinema.

Release

Theatrical
Rashomon was released in Japan on August 24, 1950. It was released theatrically in the United States by RKO Radio Pictures with English subtitles on December 26, 1951.

Home media
Rashomon has been released multiple times on DVD. The Criterion Collection issued a Blu-ray and DVD edition of the film based on the 2008 restoration, accompanied by a number of additional features.

Reception and legacy

Box office
The film performed well at the domestic Japanese box office, where it was one of the top ten highest-earning films of the year. It also performed well overseas, becoming Kurosawa's first major international hit.

In the United States, the film grossed $46,808 in 2002 and $96,568 during 2009 to 2010, for a combined  in the United States between 2002 and 2010.

In Europe, the film sold 365,300 tickets in France and Spain, and 8,292 tickets in other European countries between 1996 and 2020, for a combined total of at least  tickets sold in Europe.

Japanese critical responses
Although it won two Japanese awards, most Japanese critics did not like the film. When it received positive responses in the West, Japanese critics were baffled: some decided that it was only admired there because it was "exotic"; others thought that it succeeded because it was more "Western" than most Japanese films.

In a collection of interpretations of Rashomon, Donald Richie writes that "the confines of 'Japanese' thought could not contain the director, who thereby joined the world at large". He also quotes Kurosawa criticizing the way the "Japanese think too little of our own [Japanese] things".

International responses

The film appeared at the 1951 Venice Film Festival at the behest of an Italian language teacher, Giuliana Stramigioli, who had recommended it to Italian film promotion agency Unitalia Film seeking a Japanese film to screen at the festival. However, Daiei Motion Picture Company (a producer of popular features at the time) and the Japanese government had disagreed with the choice of Kurosawa's work on the grounds that it was "not [representative enough] of the Japanese movie industry" and felt that a work of Yasujirō Ozu would have been more illustrative of excellence in Japanese cinema. Despite these reservations, the film was screened at the festival.

Before it was screened at the Venice festival, the film initially drew little attention and had low expectations at the festival, as Japanese cinema was not yet taken seriously in the West at the time. But once it had been screened, Rashomon drew an overwhelmingly positive response from festival audiences, praising the originality of the film and its techniques while making many question the nature of truth. The film won both the Italian Critics Award and the Golden Lion award—introducing Western audiences, including Western directors, more noticeably to both Kurosawa's films and techniques, such as shooting directly into the sun and using mirrors to reflect sunlight onto the actor's faces.

The film was released in the United States on December 26, 1951, by RKO Radio Pictures in both subtitled and dubbed versions, and it won an Academy Honorary Award in 1952 for being "the most outstanding foreign language film released in the United States during 1951" (the current Academy Award for Best Foreign Language Film wasn't introduced until 1956). The following year, when it was eligible for consideration in other Academy Award categories, it was nominated for Best Art Direction for a Black-and-White Film.

Upon release in North America, Ed Sullivan gave the film a positive review in Hollywood Citizen-News, calling it "an exciting evening, because the direction, the photography and the performances will jar open your eyes." He praised Akutagawa's original plot, Kurosawa's impactful direction and screenplay, Mifune's "magnificent" villainous performance, and Miyagawa's "spellbinding" cinematography that achieves "visual dimensions that I've never seen in Hollywood photography" such as being "shot through a relentless rainstorm that heightens the mood of the somber drama." In the early 1960s, film historians credited Rashomon as the start of the international New Wave cinema movement, which gained popularity during the late 1950s to early 1960s.

Rotten Tomatoes, a review aggregator, reports that 98% of 52 surveyed critics gave the film a positive review; with an average rating of 9.3/10. The site's consensus reads: "One of legendary director Akira Kurosawa's most acclaimed films, Rashomon features an innovative narrative structure, brilliant acting, and a thoughtful exploration of reality versus perception." In a 1998 issue of Time Out New York, Andrew Johnston wrote: Rashomon is probably familiar even to those who haven't seen it, since in movie jargon, the film's title has become synonymous with its chief narrative conceit: a story told multiple times from various points of view. There's much more than that to the film, of course. For example, the way Kurosawa uses his camera...takes this fascinating meditation on human nature closer to the style of silent film than almost anything made after the introduction of sound. Film critic Roger Ebert gave the film four stars out of four and included it in his Great Movies list.

Remakes and adaptations

Rashomon spawned numerous remakes and adaptations across film, television and theatre. Examples include:

  Rashomon as a play, various versions of which have been performed since the 1950s, including on Broadway in 1959.
 Valerie, a 1957 American western Inspired by Kurosawa's film.
 The Outrage, a 1964 American western directed by Martin Ritt. Screenplay adapted from Kurosawa's screenplay by Michael Kanin, who also co-wrote the 1959 Broadway version.
 On The Dick Van Dyke Show, in 1962, season 2, episode 9, "The Night the Roof Fell In". Rob and Laura's perspectives of their day is countered by a goldfish.
 Yavanika, a 1982 Indian Malayalam-language film loosely based on the film. The film stars Bharat Gopy and Mammootty.
 "Rashomama", a 1983 episode of Mama's Family
 Star Trek: The Next Generation, where a 1990 episode called “A Matter of Perspective” was produced and aired with a similar plot line to Rashomon, this time told from the view of Commander Riker, the assistant of a murdered respected scientist, and the scientist’s widow.
 Courage Under Fire, a 1996 war film, in which events surrounding the rescue of a downed Bell UH-1 Iroquois helicopter in the First Gulf War are recounted in flashbacks by three different crew members.
 On Frasier, in 1997, season 5, episode 9, "Perspectives on Christmas". The family each recall their day from different perspectives.
 Farscape’s second season’s 17th episode, “The Ugly Truth”, which aired in 2000, follows this format, challenging the crew of Moya as liars, as the interrogators are a species with eidetic memory who can’t comprehend subjective viewpoints.
 On CSI: Crime Scene Investigation, in the 2006, Season 6, Episode 21 "Rashomama". Nick's car containing all the evidence for a murder is stolen and the team attempts to continue the investigation based on their conflicting memories of the crime scene.
 Vantage Point, a 2008 film with multiple viewpoints focusing on an assassination attempt on the President of the United States
 The Rashomon Job, an episode of the series Leverage (2008–2012) telling the story of a heist from five points of view (S03E11) 
 At the Gate of the Ghost, a 2011 Thai film by M.L. Pundhevanop Devakula, adapting Kurosawa's screenplay to ancient Ayutthaya.
 Police Story 2013, a 2013 film partially inspired by some plot elements
 Ulidavaru Kandanthe, a 2014 Kannada film directed Rakshit Shetty, where a journalist narrates the story of a murder in 7 different viewpoints by giving special reference to local Tulu people and their culture.
 Talvar, a 2015 Hindi film narrates the story of a double murder through multiple contradictory viewpoints.
 The Handmaiden, a 2016 Korean erotic psychological thriller told in 3 parts through multiple views.
 The Bottomless Bag, a 2017 Russian film by Rustam Khamdamov, also based on Akutagawa's In a Grove.
 Tombstone Rashomon, a 2017 film that tells the story of the Gunfight at the O.K. Corral in the style of Rashomon.
 The Last Duel, Ridley Scott's 2021 epic historical drama of a rape and duel told through multiple points of view.
 On King of the Hill, in 1999, season 3, episode 10, "A Fire Fighting We Will Go". The gang each recalls the burning down of a firehouse from their perspective, each portraying themselves as the hero.

Preservation
In 2008, the film was restored by the Academy Film Archive, the National Film Center of the National Museum of Modern Art, Tokyo, and Kadokawa Pictures, Inc., with funding provided by the Kadokawa Culture Promotion Foundation and The Film Foundation.

Awards and honors
 Blue Ribbon Awards (1951) Best Screenplay: Akira Kurosawa and Shinobu Hashimoto
 Mainichi Film Concours (1951) Best Actress: Machiko Kyō
 Venice Film Festival (1951) Golden Lion: Akira Kurosawa
 National Board of Review USA (1951) Best Director: Akira Kurosawa and Best Foreign Film: Japan
 24th Academy Awards, USA (1952) Honorary Award for "most outstanding foreign language film"

Top lists
The film appeared on many critics' top lists of the best films.
 5th – Top ten list in 1950, Kinema Junpo
 10th – Directors' Top Ten Poll in 1992, Sight & Sound
 10th - 100 Greatest Films list in 2000 The Village Voice
 76th - "Top 100 Essential Films of All Time" by the National Society of Film Critics in 2002.
 9th – Directors' Top Ten Poll in 2002, Sight & Sound
 13th - Critics' poll in 2002, Sight & Sound
 290th – The 500 Greatest Movies of All Time in 2008, Empire
 50 Klassiker, Film by Nicolaus Schröder in 2002
 1001 Movies You Must See Before You Die by Steven Jay Schneider in 2003
 7th – Kinema Junpo'''s The Greatest Japanese Films of All Time in 2009.
 22nd – Empire magazine's "The 100 Best Films Of World Cinema" in 2010.
 26th - Critics top ten poll, 100 Greatest Films of All Time, Sight & Sound magazine (2012)
 18th - Director's top ten poll, 100 Greatest Films of All Time, Sight & Sound magazine (2012)
 Woody Allen included it among his top ten films.
4th - BBC's list of "100 greatest foreign language films"  in 2018.

See also
 Kishōtenketsu
 List of films considered the best
 Nonlinear narrative
 Unreliable narrator
 "The Moonlit Road", a short story that may have served as an influence on RashomonNotes

References

Bibliography
 Conrad, David A. (2022) Akira Kurosawa and Modern Japan. Jefferson, North Carolina: McFarland & Co.
 Davidson, James F. (1987) "Memory of Defeat in Japan: A Reappraisal of Rashomon" in Richie, Donald (ed.). New Brunswick: Rutgers University Press, pp. 159–166.
 Erens, Patricia (1979) Akira Kurosawa: a guide to references and resources. Boston: G.K.Hall.
 
 
 Kauffman, Stanley (1987) "The Impact of Rashomon" in Richie, Donald (ed.) Rashomon. New Brunswick: Rutgers University Press, pp. 173–177.
 McDonald, Keiko I. (1987) "The Dialectic of Light and Darkness in Kurosawa's Rashomon" in Richie, Donald (ed.) Rashomon. New Brunswick: Rutgers University Press, pp. 183–192.
 Naas, Michael B. (1997) "Rashomon and the Sharing of Voices Between East and West." in Sheppard, Darren, et al., (eds.) On Jean-Luc Nancy: The Sense of Philosophy. New York: Routledge, pp. 63–90.
 Richie, Donald (1987) "Rashomon" in Richie, Donald (ed.) Rashomon. New Brunswick: Rutgers University Press, pp. 1–21.
 Richie, Donald (1984) The Films of Akira Kurosawa. (2nd ed.) Berkeley, California: University of California Press
 Sato, Tadao (1987) "Rashomon" in Richie, Donald (ed.) Rashomon New Brunswick: Rutgers University Press, pp. 167–172.
 Tyler, Parker. "Rashomon as Modern Art" (1987) in Richie, Donald (ed.) Rashomon''. New Brunswick: Rutgers University Press, pp. 149–158.

External links

 
 
 
 
 
 "The Rashomon Effect", an essay by Stephen Prince at the Criterion Collection

1950 films
1950 crime drama films
1950s crime thriller films
1950s psychological thriller films
Adultery in films
Best Foreign Language Film Academy Award winners
Japanese black-and-white films
Daiei Film films
Existentialist films
Fiction with unreliable narrators
Films scored by Fumio Hayasaka
Films set in the 8th century
Films awarded an Academy Honorary Award
Films based on short fiction
Films directed by Akira Kurosawa
Films produced by Masaichi Nagata
Films set in Kyoto
Films set in feudal Japan
Japanese courtroom films
Japanese crime drama films
Japanese crime thriller films
1950s Japanese-language films
Jidaigeki films
Golden Lion winners
Japanese nonlinear narrative films
Japanese psychological thriller films
Films about rape
Films based on works by Ryūnosuke Akutagawa
Films with screenplays by Akira Kurosawa
Films with screenplays by Shinobu Hashimoto
Rashōmon
1950s Japanese films